Ijo may refer to:

 Ijo Temple, a 10th-century Hindu temple in Yogyakarta, Indonesia
 A subgroup of the Ijaw people of Nigeria, Africa
 Ijoid languages (or Ịjọ), spoken by the Ijo people
 Southeast Ijo, an Ijaw language
 Ii, Finland, a municipality in Finland

As an acronym
 Islamic Jihad Organization
 International Journal of Obesity

See also